James Allister Taylor (born 2 May 1934) is an Australian politician.

He was born in Bairnsdale to hotel-keeper James McKenzie Taylor and Isobel Alison Young. Educated at Bairnsdale, Sale and Melbourne Grammar School, he was a stock salesman, and was also cycling champion of Victoria in 1952, 1957 and 1960. 

In 1970, he was elected to the Victorian Legislative Assembly for Gippsland South, representing the Liberal Party. He was defeated in 1973 and became a car dealer and real estate agent, before returning to parliament via the Legislative Council seat of Gippsland in 1976. He lost his seat in 1982 and returned to real estate. 

From 1985 to 1989, he was a Sale city councillor. On 22 February 1963, he married Elaine Margaret Martin, with whom he had four daughters.

References

1934 births
Living people
Liberal Party of Australia members of the Parliament of Victoria
Members of the Victorian Legislative Assembly
Members of the Victorian Legislative Council
People from Bairnsdale